Brine is water saturated or nearly saturated with salt.

Brine can also refer to:

Brining, treating food by steeping in brine
Brine (brand), a sporting goods manufacturer
Brine Lacrosse, mobile game
Brine pool, areas of brine on the ocean basin
Brine shrimp, the genus Artemia
Brine (surname)